The  Rollschuh-Club Cronenberg is a Roller Hockey team from Wuppertal, North Rhine-Westphalia, Germany. It was founded on 7 August 1954.  In 2011 won the 12th German title in 2011. Due to this fact will compete on the next edition of CERH European League in 2011-12.

Trophies
 13 German Championship

External links
 

Roller hockey clubs in Germany
Sports clubs established in 1954